The 2019/20 FIS Ski Jumping Continental Cup is the 29th in a row (27th official) Continental Cup winter season in ski jumping for men and the 16th for ladies. This is also the 18th summer continental cup season for men and 12th for ladies.

Other competitive circuits this season include the World Cup, Grand Prix, FIS Cup, FIS Race and Alpen Cup.

Map of continental cup hosts 

All 23 locations hosting continental cup events in summer (8 for men / 4 for ladies) and in winter (15 for men / 3 for ladies) this season.

 Men
 Ladies
 Men & Ladies

Men

Summer

Winter

Ladies

Summer

Winter

Men's standings

Summer

Winter

Ladies' standings

Summer

Winter

Europa Cup vs. Continental Cup 
Last two seasons of Europa Cup in 1991/92 and 1992/93 are recognized as first two Continental Cup seasons by International Ski Federation, although Continental Cup under this name officially started first season in 1993/94 season.

References 

FIS Ski Jumping Continental Cup
2019 in ski jumping
2020 in ski jumping

pl:Puchar Kontynentalny w skokach narciarskich 2019/2020